The Kent Cricket Board is the governing body for all recreational cricket in the historic county of Kent. This covers the local authorities within the modern county of Kent as well as the London boroughs of Bexley, Bromley, Greenwich and Lewisham, areas which were historically within the county.

From 1999 to 2004 the Board fielded a team in the English domestic one-day tournament.

Structure
Until 2013 The Board was structured so there are a number of sub committees, created to ensure input to the Board Executive. From 2014 the KCB merged with Kent County Cricket Club, to become the Community Department. Kent became the first county in England and Wales where there is one single body for both first-class and recreational cricket.

County Cricket Boards
Cricket in Kent